Davide Zappacosta (born 11 June 1992) is an Italian professional footballer who plays as a full-back for  club Atalanta.

Club career

Early career
Born in Sora, Lazio, Zappacosta joined hometown's Sora's youth setup in 1998, aged six, as a forward. In 2006–07 season, he was a player of Sora's under-15 team in Lazio Region Giovanissimi League. In 2008, he moved to neighbouring Isola Liri, appearing in Campionato Nazionale Dante Berretti under-20's, and made his senior debut for the side in the 2009–10 campaign; obtaining a total of 14 caps and a goal in the league.

Atalanta
In January 2011 Zappacosta joined Atalanta in a co-ownership deal for €60,000 transfer fee. He played for the Primavera for six months. He appeared during the pre-season with the main squad.

Avellino
On 31 August 2011, at age 19, he was signed by Avellino initially in temporary deal. The loan was turned into a co-ownership deal for €40,000 fee in 2012, after Atalanta bought him outright from Isola Liri for an undisclosed fee.

He played 3 seasons for Avellino, which the first two seasons in Lega Pro Prima Divisione, winning the championship of the Group B of the third-tier in the 2012–13 season as well as crowded as the grand champions after winning Trapani of the Group A. After promotion to Serie B he decided to tattoo the date "05.05.2013". The following year he scored a debut goal in Serie B in the match won 2–1 against Novara, standing out as one of the best full backs in the league.

Return to Atalanta

On 4 June 2014 Zappacosta returned to Atalanta for €900,000 fee, signing a four-year deal. He made his official debut with Atalanta on 23 August 2014 against Pisa in a 2–0 win in the third qualifying round of the Coppa Italia. On 31 August 2014 Zappacosta made his debut in Serie A, starting in a 0–0 home draw against Hellas Verona. On 6 January 2015 he scored his first Serie A goal in the 37th minute of a 2–2 draw to Genoa. On 11 January, one week later, he scored his second goal in the 72nd minute of a 1–1 home draw against Chievo Verona. On 8 February, Zappacosta scored his third goal of the season in the 9th minute of a 3–2 away defeat against Fiorentina. He finished the 2014–15 season to Atalanta with 30 appearances, three goals and one assist.

Torino
On 10 July 2015 he was sold to Torino, in the same transfer that brought the midfielder Daniele Baselli to Piedmont, for a total of €10 million transfer fee. On 20 September, Zappacosta made his debut for Torino as a substitute replacing Bruno Peres in the 76th minute of a 2–0 home win over Sampdoria. He scored his first goal for the club on 28 October during a 3–3 draw at home to Genoa. Zappacosta finished his first season to Torino with 26 appearances, one goal and one assist, and his second with 29 appearances, one goal and five assists.

Chelsea

On 31 August 2017, he was sold to Chelsea for a reported fee of €28 million plus bonuses. He signed a four-year deal at Stamford Bridge. The transfer was completed minutes before the transfer window shut on deadline day. Zappacosta made his debut for Chelsea on 9 September as a substitute replacing Victor Moses in the 74th minute of a 2–1 away win against Leicester City. He made his Champions League debut and scored his first goal for Chelsea on 12 September 2017, in a 6–0 home win against Qarabağ FK. With this goal, Zappacosta became the 100th Italian player to score a goal in the Champions League. His first Premier League goal came from outside the box in a 5–0 home win against Stoke City on 30 December 2017. At the end of the season he was an unused substitute as Chelsea beat Manchester United in the 2018 FA Cup Final.

On 29 May 2019, Zappacosta appeared in Chelsea's 4–1 victory over Arsenal in the 2019 UEFA Europa League Final, coming on as a late substitute for Eden Hazard.

Roma (loan)
On 21 August 2019, Zappacosta signed a one-year extension to his contract at Chelsea and then joined Roma on an initial six-month loan deal with an option to extend the loan until the end of the 2019–20 season. On 4 October 2019, Zappacosta suffered an anterior cruciate ligament injury during training.

Genoa (loan)
On 19 September 2020, Zappacosta returned to Italy with Genoa on loan until the end of 2020–21 season. One day later on 20 September, he scored a goal on his league debut as Genoa beat Crotone 4–1 at home.

Second return to Atalanta
On 24 August 2021, Zappacosta returned to Bergamo to sign with Atalanta on a permanent deal for his third spell at the club. He carried out his medical and signed on a 4 year contract the following day, reportedly signing from Chelsea for a fee of around €10 million, plus add ons. He scored his first goal against Sassuolo.

International career
During his period in Irpinia, he made his debut with the Italy under-21 on 5 September 2013 in a 2015 UEFA European Under-21 Championship qualifier match against Belgium, losing 3–1. He also received a call-up from Italy under-21 Serie B representative team against a team of free agent that was trained in a camp held by Italian Footballers' Association, in August 2013.

He took part in the 2015 UEFA European Under-21 Championship in the Czech Republic, playing as a starter in the right full-back position in all three of Italy's games, who were eliminated in the group stage.

In May 2016, Zappacosta was called up to the senior national team by coach Antonio Conte in preparation for the UEFA Euro 2016. He was subsequently included in the list of 30 provisional players for the tournament. On 31 May, he was named one of three reserves for the senior side for Euro 2016.

He made his international debut for Italy on 12 November 2016, against Liechtenstein in a 2018 World Cup qualifying match, starting the match as a right back.

Career statistics

Club

International

Honours
Avellino
Lega Pro Prima Divisione: 2012–13
Supercoppa di Lega Pro Prima Divisione: 2013

Chelsea
FA Cup: 2017–18
UEFA Europa League: 2018–19

References

External links

Profile at the Atalanta B.C. website
Profile at the Italian Football Federation website

1992 births
Living people
People from Sora, Lazio
People of Lazian descent
Italian footballers
Association football defenders
Italy international footballers
Italy under-21 international footballers
UEFA Europa League winning players
A.C. Isola Liri players
Atalanta B.C. players
U.S. Avellino 1912 players
Torino F.C. players
Chelsea F.C. players
A.S. Roma players
Genoa C.F.C. players
Serie C players
Serie B players
Serie A players
Premier League players
Italian expatriate footballers
Expatriate footballers in England
Italian expatriate sportspeople in England
Footballers from Lazio
Sportspeople from the Province of Frosinone